A "journey of self-discovery" refers to a travel, pilgrimage, or series of events whereby a person attempts to determine how they feel, personally, about spiritual issues or priorities, rather than following the opinions of family, friends, neighborhood or peer pressure. The topic of self-discovery has been associated with Zen.  

A related term is "finding oneself". There are different stages of finding oneself. Cultures from around the world have developed an array of modalities in the journey to discover oneself. In modern times practitioners and scientists have come together to create a map that brings clarity to the process of self-discovery. This is referred to as the levels of consciousness. 

A journey of self-discovery is a popular theme in literature. It is sometimes used to drive the plot of a novel, play or film.

Fiction 
A journey of self-discovery is a popular theme in fiction. Some films use similar phrases, such as in the film Petals: Journey Into Self Discovery (2008). The drama films Eat Pray Love (2010) and Life of Pi (2012) are also associated with the idea of a journey of self-discovery.

Literature 
 Hermann Hesse's Siddhartha (1922)
 Jack Kerouac's On the Road (1957)
 Cormac McCarthy's All the Pretty Horses (1992)
 Yann Martel's Life of Pi (2001)
 Alice Sebold's The Lovely Bones (2002)
 Elizabeth Gilbert's Eat, Pray, Love (2006)
 Craig Thompson's Habibi (2011)
 Cheryl Strayed's Wild: From Lost to Found on the Pacific Crest Trail (2012)

Film 
 El Topo (1970) and The Holy Mountain (1973) by Alejandro Jodorowsky
 A film version of Siddhartha (1972)
 The Pillow Book (1996) by Peter Greenaway
 Samsara (2001) and Valley of Flowers (2006) by Pan Nalin
 Spring, Summer, Fall, Winter... and Spring (2003) by Kim Ki-duk
 Where the Wild Things Are (2009) by Spike Jonze
 Uncle Boonmee Who Can Recall His Past Lives (2010) and Cemetery of Splendour (2015) by Apichatpong Weerasethakul
 Avalokitesvara (2013) by Zhang Xin
 Voyage (2013), Utopians (2015) and Thirty Years of Adonis (2017) by Scud
 The Tree of Life (2011) by Terrence Malick
 The Red Turtle (2016) by Michaël Dudok de Wit
 Please Stand By (2017) by Ben Lewin
 Marlina the Murderer in Four Acts (2017) by Mouly Surya
 Humba Dreams (2019) by Riri Riza
 Nine Days (2020) by Edson Oda
 Wendy (2020) by Benh Zeitlin
 Soul (2020) by Pete Docter
 Nomadland (2020) by Chloé Zhao
 Across the River and into the Trees (2022) by Peter Flannery

See also

References 

Consciousness
Literary motifs
Self
Spiritual evolution